Ashley Glenn Gorley (born April 29, 1977) is an American songwriter, publisher, and producer from Danville, Kentucky, who is based in Nashville, Tennessee. Gorley has written 60 number 1 songs and has over 300 songs recorded by artists including Luke Bryan, Jason Aldean, Florida Georgia Line, Carrie Underwood, Blake Shelton, Bon Jovi, Thomas Rhett, Jason Derulo, Kelsea Ballerini, Morgan Wallen and Dan + Shay.

Biography
Gorley was born in Danville, Kentucky, the son of Glenn and Sandra Gorley (née Alexander).

Songwriting accolades

Tape Room Music 
In 2011, Gorley created Tape Room Music, a publishing company with a focus on artist development. Writers for Tape Room have already celebrated 24 No. 1 songs, and eight Top 10 singles by artists such as Florida Georgia Line, Charlie Puth, Keith Urban, Dustin Lynch, Jason Derulo, Kane Brown, and Sam Hunt, including the 2018 ASCAP Country Song of the Year, “Body Like A Back Road.”

Select discography

Tape Room discography

References

1977 births
Living people
Belmont University alumni
Songwriters from Kentucky
Writers from Danville, Kentucky
American country singer-songwriters
Country musicians from Kentucky
People from Nashville, Tennessee
21st-century American singers
Country musicians from Tennessee
Singer-songwriters from Tennessee